The Hypnotist's Love Story is a 2011 novel by Australian author Liane Moriarty. It tells the story of Ellen O’Farrel, a hypnotherapist, who becomes involved with a widower being stalked by his ex-girlfriend. The book is Moriarty's fourth novel.

Reception
The novel received mostly positive reviews. About the novel, the Kirkus Reviews wrote "Amazingly, the effervescent comedy and troubling melodrama combine to create a satisfying beach read, escapist but not unintelligent."

Film adaptation
In 2019 ABC ordered a pilot based on the novel, with Heather Graham set to star in the series and Katie Wech set to write.

References

2011 Australian novels
Macmillan Publishers books